Chixtape 5 is the fourth studio album by Canadian rapper Tory Lanez. It was released on November 15, 2019 through Mad Love and Interscope Records. This is the fifth instalment of the Chixtape series which is inspired by and contains samples of "2000s-era R&B hits". The production on the album was mostly handled by Tory Lanez and Play Picasso. The album also includes guest appearances by Jagged Edge, T-Pain, Chris Brown, The-Dream, Mýa, Ashanti, Trey Songz, Lil Wayne, Fabolous and more.

Chixtape 5 was preceded by the single "Jerry Sprunger" featuring T-Pain. The album received generally positive reviews from music critics and was a commercial success. It debuted at number two on the US Billboard 200 and number one on the US Top R&B/Hip-Hop Albums charts, earning 83,000 album-equivalent units in its first week. In November 2021, the album was certified gold by the Recording Industry Association of America (RIAA).

Background
Chixtape 5 is the first of the series in which it was released as an album on streaming platforms. The album cleared all of the samples and includes the original artist featured on the song. In an interview with Billboard, Tory Lanez said "Everything is 2000s-inspired. Everything is inspired by the times when things were golden for us. I think all those pieces and everything that we've come out with has been all about nostalgia. I'm about to take you on a whole journey musically."

The singer said that the album was heavily inspired by Chris Brown's album Indigo, inspiring him with its edited low-pitched background vocals, its samples from early 2000s R&B, and how double tracks from that album were managed.

Promotion
On November 1, 2019, Tory Lanez announced the album's release date with Ashanti on the cover art. Tory Lanez launched a website named after the album with an interface designed after the social network website MySpace.

Singles
On November 8, 2019, he released the lead single of the album, "Jerry Sprunger" featuring T-Pain, accompanied by a music video. The single debuted at number 83 on the US Billboard Hot 100 on the week of November 23, 2019. The following week, the single reached it peak at number 44 on the chart, following the album's release. The single also peaked at number 34 on the Canadian Hot 100 and number 32 on the UK Singles Chart respectively.

Other songs
After the album's release, "The Take" featuring Chris Brown debuted at number 66 on the Billboard Hot 100 chart. The song also peaked at number 68 on the Canadian Hot 100 chart. "Beauty in the Benz" featuring Snoop Dogg debuted at number 87 on the Billboard Hot 100 chart. The single also peaked at number 64 on the Canadian Hot 100 and number 70 on the UK Singles Chart respectively. In addition, "The Trade" featuring Jagged Edge and Jermaine Dupri managed to peaked at number one on the US Bubbling Under the Hot 100 chart.

Critical reception

Chixtape 5 was received generally positive reviews from music critics. At Metacritic, which assigns a normalized rating out of 100 to reviews from professional publications, the album received an average score of 61, based on five reviews.

Commercial performance
Chixtape 5 debuted at number two on the US Billboard 200, earning 83,000 album-equivalent units, (including 9,000 copies as pure album sales) in its first week. This became Tory Lanez's fourth US top-ten debut on the chart. The album also accumulated a total of 94 million on-demand audio streams for the album’s songs that week, becoming Tory's highest first week streaming figures to date. On November 15, 2021, the album was certified gold by the Recording Industry Association of America (RIAA) for combined sales and album-equivalent units of over 500,000 units in the United States.

Track listing
Credits adapted from Tidal.

Notes
 "Jalissa's Back! (Skit)", "Blowin' Mine's // Leah's Introduction (Skit)", and "Last Love Letter (Skit)" features vocals by Brittany Taylor 
 The Trade contains a sample of Trade It All Pt. 2 by Fabolous, P Diddy, and Jagged Edge
 Jerry Sprunger contains a sample of I'm Sprung by T-Pain
 Beauty In The Benz contains a sample of Beautiful by Snoop Dogg
 Blowin Mines contains a sample of Let's Get Blown By Snoop Dogg and Pharrell Williams
 The Take contains a sample of Take You Down by Chris Brown
 The Fargo Splash contains a sample of Splash Waterfalls by Ludacris
 Luv Ya Gyal contains a sample of I Luv Your Girl by The-Dream Ft. Young Jeezy
 Yessirr contains a sample of Your Body by Pretty Ricky
 Best Of You contains a sample of Best of Me, Part 2 by Mya Ft. Jay-Z
 The Cry contains a sample of Crying Out for Me by Mario
 Still Waiting contains a sample of Can't Help But Wait by Trey Songz
 A Fools Tale (Running Back) contains a sample of Foolish by Ashanti

Personnel
Credits adapted from Tidal.

Musicians
 Todd Pritchard – instrumental ensemble 
 Daniel Gonzalez – instrumental ensemble 
 Larry Cooper, Jr. – instrumental ensemble 
 Sebastian Rompotis – instrumental ensemble 
 Benjamin Lasnier – instrumental ensemble 

Technical
 Johann Chavez – mixing , engineering 
 Play Picasso – mixing 
 Chris Gehringer – mastering 
 Tory Lanez – engineering 
 Michael Romero – engineering 
 T-Pain – engineering 
 Philip "DJ Hardwerk" Constable – engineering 
 Andrew Grossman – engineering

Charts

Weekly charts

Year-end charts

Certifications

References

2019 albums
Tory Lanez albums
Interscope Records albums